Malgachemenes is a monotypic genus of potter wasps endemic to Madagascar. The sole species is Malgachemenes angustus.

References

Biological pest control wasps
Potter wasps
Monotypic Hymenoptera genera